Black raspberry necrosis virus (BRNV) is a plant pathogen virus of the genus Sadwavirus found in black raspberries (rubus occidentalis). The virus causes leaf chlorosis, mottling and puckering. Affected plants typically fail to yield fruits after three to four years.

References

External links
 ICTVdB - The Universal Virus Database: Black raspberry necrosis virus
 Family Groups - The Baltimore Method

Secoviridae
Viral plant pathogens and diseases
Raspberry diseases